Lab Tests Online (now Testing.com) is a peer-reviewed non-profit web resource about clinical laboratory testing.   The site provides information on clinical lab tests as well as conditions that are managed or diagnosed by lab tests.  Lab Tests Online also provides summaries of recommendations by age, feature articles on lab-related topics, and news items of patient interest. All contents are reviewed and approved by an Editorial Review Board composed of laboratory professionals before being posted to the site.

The site was launched in 2001 by the American Association for Clinical Chemistry, the scientific society for clinical laboratory science and is a collaboration with other professional societies representing the laboratory medicine community. The website is mirrored on other sites in other countries and is available via mobile apps in several countries.

In January 2021, AACC’s Lab Tests Online (labtestsonline.org) was acquired by OneCare Media. In November of 2021, LabTestsOnline.org was rebranded to Testing.com.

References

External links

American medical websites
Chemical pathology